The Review of Maritime Transport (RMT) an annual publication by the United Nations Conference on Trade and Development (UNCTAD). It provides an analysis of structural and cyclical changes affecting seaborne trade, ports and shipping, as well as an extensive collection of statistical information 

The RMT is prepared by the Division on Technology and Logistics of the UNCTAD secretariat, it is an important source of information on the port sector. It closely monitors developments affecting world seaborne trade, freight rates, ports, surface transport and logistics services, as well as trends in ship ownership, port/flag state control, fleet age, tonnage supply and productivity.

Structure of publication
The review of maritime transport provides insights on:

Seaborne trade
Emerging trends affecting maritime transport
Fleet ownership and registration
Shipbuilding and demolitions
Freight rates
Liner shipping connectivity
Port traffic
Legal and regulatory developments
A topical issue covered in a special chapter

RMT List of yearly Special chapter
1997: Review of regional developments in small island developing countries
1998: Trade and transport of East and South-East Asia
1999: Recent trade and transport developments in Latin America 
2000: Developments in the sub-Saharan African economic area and maritime transport
2001: Regional developments in trade and transport networks in East Asia, China and Japan
2002: Container port traffic and container terminal throughput
2003: Developments in African trade and maritime transport 
2004: Developments in Asian trade and maritime transport.
2005: Developments in Latin American and Caribbean trade and maritime transport 
2006: Sub Saharan Africa
2007: Asia
2008: Latin America and Caribbean
2009: Africa
2010: Asia
2011: Developing countries in different maritime businesses.
2012: Sustainable freight transport development and finance

2013: Securing Reliable Access to Maritime Transport for Landlocked Countries

2014: Small Island Developing States (SIDS)

2015: Shipping and Sustainable Development

2016: Determinants of Maritime Transport Costs

2017: Maritime transport connectivity

2018: Technological developments

2019: Sustainable Shipping

2020: Shipping in times of the Covid-19 pandemic

2021: Challenges faced by seafarers in view of the COVID-19 crisis

2022: Navigating stormy waters

See also
 Ship Transport
 Merchant vessel
 UNCTAD

External links
 Porteconomics is a web-based initiative of the European Union, aiming at generating knowledge about seaports. It is developed and empowered by the members of the PortEconomics group, that are actively involved in academic and contract research in port economics, management, and policy.
 UNCTAD intergovernmental body that publishes the RMT

References

Maritime transport
United Nations General Assembly subsidiary organs
International development
International factor movements
Publications established in 1964
Publications established in 1968
Annual journals
Transportation journals